Trischistognatha is a genus of moths of the family Crambidae.

Species
Trischistognatha limatalis 
Trischistognatha ochritacta 
Trischistognatha palindialis (Guenée, 1854)
Trischistognatha pyrenealis (Walker, 1859)
Trischistognatha yepezi

References

Natural History Museum Lepidoptera genus database

Evergestinae